Ronon Dex is a fictional character in the 2004 science fiction television series Stargate Atlantis. Played by Jason Momoa, he is from Sateda, a civilization which was at a technological level comparable to Earth in the mid-20th century before it was devastated by the Wraith alongside all other advanced civilizations in the Pegasus galaxy. When Ronon Dex and the Atlantis expedition first met in the season 2 episode "Runner", Ronon Dex had been a Runner for the past seven years. He joined the Atlantis Expedition shortly afterward, effectively replacing Aiden Ford on Sheppard's team after Ford had become addicted to a Wraith enzyme and had fled Atlantis.

Jason Momoa, along with some of his fellow cast members, has said that they think of Ronon as the Atlantis version of Chewbacca. This joke is also carried through into the show, and Lt Col Sheppard occasionally refers to Ronon as "Chewy."

Role in Stargate Atlantis
Ronon is a native of Sateda, a planet with an advanced level of technology. His grandfather suffered from Second Childhood, a condition with symptoms similar to Alzheimer's disease. Ronon became a member of the Satedan military and held the rank of Specialist. He was very close to a woman named Melena, whom Ronon considered "close enough" to a wife in "Sunday". Approximately seven years before Ronon's first contact with the Atlantis Expedition, the Wraith attacked Sateda. Ronon remained behind with Melena to fight the Wraith, but the Wraith defeated Satedan forces and Melena was killed before Ronon's eyes in an explosion. Ronon was later captured by the Wraith. When the Wraith discovered that he was much stronger and more resilient than the normal human on Sateda (or any other human civilisation in Pegasus), they turned him into a Runner, implanting a tracking device in his upper back and setting him loose to be constantly hunted. (for sports, training etc. as Ronon said later to Teyla).

Ronon stayed alive for seven years by learning several new tricks and deciding to hunt the Wraith back with his weapons. He owns a rare energy pistol which emits red bursts of energy that stun or kill at the user's discretion. It resembles a revolver with a power cell where the ammunition cylinder would be located. The same type of weapon is shown to be used by a people in the season 4 episode "Travelers", but Ronon displays no knowledge of these people. Ronon also carries a sword; the hilt is made from a Wraith mandible and humerus wrapped in Wraith hair, the blade is made from the metal of a Wraith ship, and the scabbard is made from a Wraith leather coat. The episode "The Hive" shows Ronon carrying several knives hidden on his person for use in emergencies. (He uses four in the episode and it is implied there may be more.) Ronon's seemingly unlimited supply of these blades is a source of occasional comic relief.

When the Atlantis team encounters Ronon for the first time in season 2's "Runner", they arrange the removal of the tracking device in his back. Ronon returns with them to Atlantis, where he learns that Sateda had been completely destroyed. Sheppard offers Ronon a place on his team in "Duet" after Ronon proves his worth against the Marines and Teyla in hand-to-hand combat and demonstrates his experience with guns. Ronon finds out in "Trinity" that about 300 Satedans survived the Wraith attacks and moved to other planets. In season 3's "Sateda", Ronon gets revenge on the Wraith who originally turned him into a Runner. Ronon meets with three of his old Satedan friends in season 4's "Reunion" and seriously considers leaving the Atlantis Expedition for the first time until he learns that his old friends are Wraith Worshippers. In the end, Ronon remains with the Atlantis Expedition, stating that his friends are "right here".

In season 4's "Midway", Teal'c comes to Atlantis to advise Ronon on how to deal with the IOA. This immediately provokes a rivalry, and Ronon and Teal'c engage in a sparring match. After an hour of intense but inconclusive fighting, it is proven they are equally matched. Together, they fight a group of Wraith who attempt to gate to Earth; in the process, Dex saves Teal'c from a Wraith who is feeding on him and earns IOA approval of his presence at Atlantis. (The rivalry as such is resolved; the question of who could beat whom is left open, but they become friends instead of rivals.) In one episode of season 4, Ronon and Dr. Jennifer Keller appears to take a romantic interest in each other. In Season 5 episodes "Taken," "First Contact," and "The Lost Tribe," their potential attraction is again suggested until Dr. Keller reveals that she is interested in Dr. Rodney McKay. In season 5's final episode, "Enemy at the Gate", Ronon is killed during an assault on a Wraith hive that had reached Earth's orbit. He is then revived by a Wraith and interrogated, only to be rescued by Sheppard and crew. Dex is last seen with the Atlantis Expedition crew as they safely land a cloaked but disabled Atlantis near the Golden Gate Bridge.

Conceptual history

The working name for Ronon's homeworld planet was Atteria, not Sateda.

After Momoa was cast in the role, the Sci Fi Channel objected to him keeping his long, heavy 6-pound dreadlocks.  However the hair soon became a signature of the character, and when Momoa decided to cut them off (with the producers' permission) after the completion of Season 4, he was still required to have his hair sewn back on for at least the first three episodes until there would be a scene where Ronon cuts his hair off in "Broken Ties". According to Momoa, it took nine hours to sew his hair back on for the beginning of the fifth season but wearing it was too painful for him to continue working. Meanwhile, the Sci Fi Channel overruled the decision for Ronon to lose his hair, the scene had already been filmed and got cut, so he was eventually given a custom-made $10,000 wig that weighed the same as Momoa's former hair, as a replacement for the rest of the season. In interviews, Momoa says that the wig was more painful and cumbersome than his original dreadlocks. Also, Momoa used various tricks to cover up several of his tattoos, including the sizeable tribal tattoo on his left forearm. Eventually, the writers incorporated a scene in the episode "Reunion" wherein he gets the tattoo.

When Valerie Halverson took over as lead costume designer in the fourth season, Jason Momoa would bring her pieces of fabric from flea markets, which the costume department would fashion into clothing for his character.

References

External links 
 Ronon Dex at Stargate wikia
 Ronon Dex at scifi.com

Fictional soldiers
Fictional hunters
Stargate alien characters
Television characters introduced in 2005

sv:Lista över rollfigurer i Stargate#Ronon Dex